This article details the Bradford Bulls rugby league football club's 2013 season, the 18th season of the Super League era.

Season Review

August 2012

It was announced that academy product Tom Burgess would be joining his brothers (Luke Burgess, Sam Burgess and twin brother George Burgess) at NRL side South Sydney Rabbitohs on a two-year deal. Meanwhile, young halfback Kyle Briggs announced he had signed for former club Featherstone Rovers on a two-year deal. Kyle had spent the entire 2012 season on loan at Featherstone.

September 2012

September was a positive month in terms of off-field problems as local businessman Omar Khan agreed to purchase the Bulls for £150,000 with an additional £100,000 to be paid in 2015. This move took the Bulls out of administration however their Super League status is still in jeopardy and must go through a mini-licensing process against Championship clubs Halifax, Leigh Centurions and Featherstone Rovers. Ben Jeffries announced that he was returning home to Australia at the end of the season to become a miner and play part-time for the Kurri Kurri Bulldogs. Veteran second-rower Ian Sibbit announces that he will retire from rugby at the end of the season. Second rower Olivier Elima signs a 2 Year Deal with his former club Catalans Dragons as he wishes to live in his home country and send his children to a French school. Fullback Brett Kearney scooped up Player of the Year at the awards evening. However Prop Bryn Hargreaves announced his retirement to take up a degree at university. Australian coach Mick Potter announces that he will return home to his native land after working without pay at the Bulls. Good news soon followed though as the Rugby Football League (RFL) released a statement providing the Bulls with a 1-year probationary licence which means the Bulls will have to face a review at the end of the 2013 season. Francis Cummins was announced as the head coach and signs a 3 Year Deal for the job. Winger and academy product Jason Crookes Finally made his move to Hull F.C. on a 3 Year Deal after months of rumours. Utility player Chev Walker signed a 1-year extension to his contract with the Bulls. It was announced at the annual awards evening that Mick Potter won Coach of the Year for his efforts at Bradford during a hard 2012 season.

October 2012

Paul Sykes signs a 1 Year Deal with Wakefield Trinity Wildcats after spending most of the 2012 season on loan at the West Yorkshire club. After much rumour and speculation Bradford born youngster John Bateman signs an improved 3 Year Extension with the Bulls keeping him at Odsal until 2015. Leeds based Hunslet Hawks announce the signing of Bulls academy product Callum Windley on a 1 Year Deal after he was released due to the U20's being scrapped and replaced by the U23's and U19's competitions. Coach Francis Cummins released winger Karl Pryce, prop Phil Joseph and also youngster Alex Ball. Bradford's first signing of the new season came in the form of Warrington Wolves centre Matty Blythe on a 1 Year Loan Deal after Francis Cummins was heavily recommended to Blythe by Wolves coach Tony Smith. Young fullback Curtis Naughton (3 Year Deal), centre Sam Wood (2 Year Deal) and second rower Oliver Roberts (3 Year Deal) were all give professional contracts and promoted to the first team. Halfback Luke Gale signs a 3 Year extension to his contract keeping him at Bradford until 2015. Tongan prop Manase Manuokafoa signed a 2 Year Extension to his contract. October kept on being productive with the announcement that Maltese halfback Jarrod Sammut signed a 2 Year Extension with the club subject to acquiring a working visa. Academy product Danny Addy also signed a 1 Year Extension to his contract. It was announced that popular winger Shaun Ainscough would leave the Bulls after being offered less money to play, he will join the South City Bulls in New South Wales, Australia. Meanwhile, Rajas (a fast food chain) becomes the first major sponsorship by an Asian businessman in the club's history. Bradford announced that they had signed a 4-year deal with kit maker ISC who supply 7 other Super League teams with kits, this brings an end to a 5-year deal with Kooga.

November 2012

The Bulls announce their 2nd capture of the season, Warrington Wolves prop Ben Evans on a 1 Year loan deal, he is the twin brother of Wolves centre Rhys Evans. Bradford also signed St. Helens youngster Jamie Foster on a 1 Year permanent deal. On the 9th Bradford announced a record breaking sponsorship with loan firm Provident Financial, this sponsorship will be worth £1.2 million over a period of 4 years making it the biggest ever sponsorship in the Super League history, on the same day the Bulls also previewed the 2013 home shirt. Young loose-forward James Donaldson signed a 1-year extension to his contract. A couple of days before the fixtures were due to be released clubs were allowed to tweet their first home and away game of the season, Bradford announced they will kick off the 2013 season at home against Wakefield Trinity Wildcats with their second game at the KC Stadium to play Hull FC. The squad numbers were released and youngster John Bateman was handed the number 11 shirt from Olivier Elima whilst Jarrod Sammut will wear the number 6 jersey.

December 2012

It was a pretty quiet month for the Bulls except for the announcement that Salford City Reds prop Adam Sidlow had signed for Bradford on a two-year deal and would wear the number 27 for 2013.

January 2013

On loan prop Ben Evans had to have surgery on his shoulder and he was out for four months. Also former player Ian Sibbit returned to be a part of coach Francis Cummins's backroom staff. Bradford's first pre-season game saw them beat local team Dewsbury Rams 48-6; Elliott Whitehead was the star of the game, scoring 4 tries. Heath L'Estrange, Matty Blythe, Matt Diskin and Manase Manuokafoa also scored tries whilst Jamie Foster enjoyed a good performance with the boot kicking all 8 goals. The week after businesswoman of the year Kate Hardcastle joined the Bulls in a non-executive role. In their final pre-season game the Bulls drew 24-24 with Leeds Rhinos for Danny McGuire's testimonial, Jarrod Sammut and Brett Kearney both scored 2 tries each and Jamie Foster kicked 4 goals. Bradford also showed off their new purple, white and green away kit for 2013.

February 2013

The Bulls announced that their entire squad barring Matty Blythe and Ben Evans (who are on loan) have been dual registered with Dewsbury Rams; this means that anybody who doesn't get into Bradford's game day squad is available to play for the Rams. Bradford kicked off 2013 with a 40-6 win over Wakefield Trinity Wildcats; Michael Platt opened the scoring and then Matty Blythe and Adam Sidlow both scored on debut. Jarrod Sammut then grabbed a brace of tries whilst Jamie Foster and Brett Kearney also crossed to score, Foster added 6 goals to ensure the Bulls started with a win. That same weekend James Donaldson and Adam O'Brien featured for Dewsbury Rams under the dual registration and O'Brien scored 2 tries to help the Rams to an opening round victory. Bradford were due to play Hull F.C. away on 8 February but due to an accident on the M62 the game was postponed until the 10th. The Bulls were poor against a strong Hull side but Matty Blythe and Brett Kearney both managed to score in the 28-12 loss with Jamie Foster also kicking 2 goals. Bradford got back to winning ways as a Brett Kearney hat-trick helped them to a 38-12 win over Castleford Tigers. Adam Sidlow, Matty Blythe and Chev Walker also scored tries and Jamie Foster slotted over 7 goals. February finished on a sour note as the Bulls went down 36-10 to St Helens R.F.C., the Bulls were never at the races but managed to grab two late tries from Brett Kearney and Elliot Kear with former Saints player Jamie Foster kicking a goal.

March 2013

The Bulls soon got back to winning ways as they bounced back and hammered Huddersfield Giants 43-18. Jarrod Sammut had a hat-trick whilst Matty Blythe, Danny Addy, Brett Kearney and Adam O'Brien (his first Super League try) all crossed to score. Jamie Foster kicked 7 goals and Sammut slotted over a drop goal to ensure the points came to Bradford. The Bulls backed this great performance with a 22-22 draw against Widnes Vikings. Gareth Hock was sent off before halftime when the Bulls were 20-4 in front however the 12 man Widnes side fought back an appalling 2nd half Bradford to claim a point of the Bulls. Bradford's tries came from Jamie Langley, Brett Kearney, Matt Diskin and Keith Lulia whilst Jarrod Sammut kicked 3 goals. The Bulls depleted side beat a travelling Hull Kingston Rovers side 34-12 with Jamie Foster, Brett Kearney, Elliot Kear, John Bateman and Jarrod Sammut (2 tries) all scoring, Jamie Foster kicked 5 goals to ensure that the Bulls took the points. Australian centre Adrian Purtell made his comeback after suffering a heart attack against Leeds Rhinos last season. The Bulls lost away to Catalans Dragons for the second year running as Elliot Kear and John Bateman's tries weren't enough to stop the French side beating Bradford 30-10, Jamie Foster also kicked a goal. Bradford finished March with an 18-18 draw against arch rivals Leeds Rhinos, Adrian Purtell and Tom Olbison gave the Bulls a 12-12 halftime score. However Leeds fought back to lead 18-12 but a late Adam Sidlow try helped secure a point for the Bulls.

April 2013

The Bulls started April with an average performance as they beat Salford City Reds 36-24, John Bateman, Adrian Purtell, Brett Kearney and Jamie Langley all scored a try each and Jarrod Sammut scored a double. Jamie Foster added 4 goals before going off injured and Sammut added a further 2 goals. Bradford continued their impressive run of form with a 46-20 win against London Broncos. Jarrod Sammut was once again the star of the game as he ran in four second half tries and landed 6 goals to keep the Bulls in 3rd place, Elliott Whitehead also crossed for 2 tries with Danny Addy and Chev Walker each grabbing a try. Bradford were brought back down to earth with a dismal first half performance which led to a 36-6 defeat at the hands of Wigan Warriors, all six points came from Jarrod Sammut. Bradford started their Challenge Cup run with a 70-10 thrashing of lower league Rochdale Hornets. Sam Wood scored a try on his debut whilst Luke Gale and Jarrod Sammut scored 2 each. Elliott Whitehead grabbed himself a hat-trick while Jamie Langley, Chev Walker, John Bateman and Michael Platt also crossed for a try each, Jamie Foster added 2 goals before going off injured and Sammut booted a further 9 goals. They finished the month with a 32-4 loss to Warrington Wolves with the Bulls only points coming from an Adrian Purtell try.

May 2013

The Bulls had a disappointing start to May as they were well beaten at home (42-22) by arch-rivals Leeds Rhinos, on loan Ben Evans opened the scoring for Bradford as he crossed for his 1st try for the Bulls. Further tries were added by Brett Kearney and a double from Elliot Kear, Jarrod Sammut also kicked 3 goals in Jamie Foster's absence. Bradford's season got worse as they were beaten 25-16 in the 5th Round of the Challenge Cup by London Broncos. Jarrod Sammut, Nick Scruton and Elliot Kear scored for the Bulls as they were knocked out of the cup with Sammut also kicking 2 goals. Young winger Jamie Foster re-signed with the Bulls for a further 2 years. Due to an injury crisis in the pack Francis Cummins brought in Jacob Fairbank from Huddersfield Giants on a one-month loan. The Bulls overcame this defeat by beating struggling Salford City Reds 28-7 with Matty Blythe scoring 2 tries with Luke Gale, Adrian Purtell and Matt Diskin also scoring tries. Sammut added 4 goals to give the Bulls a much needed win. The last game of May saw the Bulls face Huddersfield Giants at the Magic Weekend, Bradford had an injury hit side and were out-muscled by a large Giants pack who won the game 42-6 with Jamie Foster scoring the Bulls only points.

June 2013

June started off bad for the Bulls as they lost 28-18 to playoff rivals Hull Kingston Rovers. Jarrod Sammut, Keith Lulia and Michael Platt all scored a try with Sammut kicking 2 goals and Luke Gale kicking another, however Hull KR won the game in the last 10–15 minutes with 2 breakaway tries. This defeat was followed up by the news that young second-row Tom Olbison had signed a new 2-year deal at the club keeping him until 2015, however the good news was short lived after it was announced that homegrown second-row Elliott Whitehead had handed in a transfer request as he wishes to play at a top 4 side. Coach Francis Cummins stated at the time that Whitehead has been put on indefinite leave and will play no further part in the Bulls season. The Bulls then faced an out of form St Helens R.F.C. side, however Cummins men were not up to the task and lost 30-18 with Brett Kearney, Matty Blythe and Elliot Kear scoring for the Bulls. Gale also kicked 3 goals in the defeat. One of the positive points in that game is that young second-rower Oliver Roberts was handed his debut off the bench. News surrounding the club increased in the lead up to Bradford's first home game in over a month. The first bit of news was that veteran second-rower Chev Walker had signed a new 1-year deal with an option of another. Then it was announced that the Bulls had signed Warrington Wolves and England RL prop Gareth Carvell had signed with the Bulls on a 2 Year Deal which will add a bit of size to the relatively small Bradford pack. However bad news was soon to follow as Keith Lulia is set to go back home to Australia at the end of the year and youngster Danny Addy has rejected a new deal that was offered to him. French based Catalans Dragons announced that they had signed Elliott Whitehead on a 2 and a half year deal. It was also announced that hooker and captain Matt Diskin signed a 1 Year Extension to his contract. Bradford also revealed that legend and fan favourite Robbie Paul would be returning to the club as deputy director. Bradford finished the month with a 26-12 loss to Warrington Wolves the Bulls scored late tries through Walker and Donaldson but it wasn't enough to come back and beat the Wolves.

July 2013

The month started off with some good news as Huddersfield Giants second-row Dale Ferguson was announced as the Bulls 2nd new signing for the 2014 season. Ferguson was signed on a 2 Year Deal after other clubs such as Hull Kingston Rovers had also offered deals. In addition to this it was also announced that prop Manase Manuokafoa had signed a 2 Year Extension to his contract. Bradford travelled to Wigan Warriors where they suffered a 26-20 defeat after letting go of an 18-4 lead, the Bulls scored through Michael Platt, Adam Sidlow and John Bateman while Jamie Foster added 4 goals. Bradford managed to beat Hull F.C. 19-12 to get back on the road to the playoffs. The Bulls tries came from Jarrod Sammut, Elliot Kear and Matt Diskin whilst Jamie Foster kicked 3 goals and Luke Gale slotted a drop goal. Recruitment for the 2014 season continued as the Bulls announced that they had signed Luke George on a 2 Year Deal from Huddersfield Giants.

August 2013

It was announced that loan signing Matty Blythe had signed a permanent 3 Year Deal with the Bulls from Warrington Wolves. Bradford's push for the playoffs received a huge boost as they beat Wakefield Trinity Wildcats 26-24 with Keith Lulia scoring 2 tries, Brett Kearney, Tom Olbison and Jamie Foster all scored a try each too while Foster kicked 3 goals. The following week saw the Bulls lose 23-22 to Catalans Dragons. Lulia once again scored 2 tries with Kearney adding another, Adrian Purtell also crossed for a try while Foster kicked 3 goals. The game was lost in controversial fashion as Kearney was sin-binned with 7 minutes to go for a professional foul on Elliott Whitehead and Ian Henderson crossed the try line to draw before Thomas Bosc slotted the decisive drop goal to win. Bradford's playoff hopes were ended as they lost 46-34 to Castleford Tigers, Jarrod Sammut scored 2 tries whilst Brett Kearney, Nick Scruton, Elliot Kear and Danny Addy also scored tries. Jamie Foster added 5 goals but it wasn't enough and the Bulls were out of the playoffs for the 5th year in a row. Some positive news followed as youngster James Donaldson re-signed with the Bulls for another year. Danny Addy also signed a 2 Year Extension with the Bulls. The Bulls announced that they had signed young Stand Off Lee Gaskell on a 2 Year Deal from St. Helens.

September 2013

After all the good news off the pitch that August brought there was bad news on the pitch in September. The Bulls puck in a lackluster performance against London Broncos and lost 20-10, Keith Lulia and Danny Addy scored for the Bulls while Jamie Foster kicked a goal. The Bulls finished the season with a 58-6 win against a young Huddersfield Giants side. Jarrod Sammut grabbed 4 tries whilst Lulia signed off with a hat-trick. Danny Addy, Jamie Foster and Elliot Kear also scored tries, Jamie Foster kicked 9 goals.

2013 Milestones

Round 1: Matty Blythe, Jamie Foster and Adam Sidlow all made their debuts for the Bulls.
Round 1: Matty Blythe, Jamie Foster and Adam Sidlow scored their 1st tries for the Bulls.
Round 1: Jamie Foster kicked his 1st goal for the Bulls.
Round 3: Jobe Murphy made his debut for the Bulls.
Round 3: Brett Kearney scored his 2nd hat-trick for the Bulls.
Round 5: Jarrod Sammut scored his 2nd hat-trick for the Bulls.
Round 5: Jarrod Sammut kicked his 1st drop goal for the Bulls.
Round 5: Adam O'Brien scored his 1st try for the Bulls.
Round 6: Matt Diskin made his 50th appearance for the Bulls.
Round 6: Jarrod Sammut reached 100 points for the Bulls.
Round 9: Danny Addy made his 50th appearance for the Bulls.
Round 10: Elliott Whitehead made his 100th appearance for the Bulls.
Round 11: Jarrod Sammut scored his 2nd four-try haul and 3rd hat-trick for the Bulls.
CCR4: Sam Wood and Ben Evans make their debuts for the Bulls.
CCR4: Sam Wood scored his 1st try for the Bulls.
CCR4: Elliott Whitehead scored his 4th hat-trick for the Bulls.
Round 14: Tom Olbison made his 50th appearance for the Bulls.
Round 14: Ben Evans scored his 1st try for the Bulls.
Round 15: Jacob Fairbank made his debut for the Bulls.
Round 15: Jarrod Sammut reached 200 points for the Bulls.
Round 17: Jamie Langley made his 250th appearance for the Bulls.
Round 18: Oliver Roberts made his debut for the Bulls.
Round 20: Alex Mellor made his debut for the Bulls.
Round 21: Jamie Foster reached 100 points for the Bulls.
Round 22: Jarrod Sammut scored his 25th try for the Bulls.
Round 23: Keith Lulia and James Donaldson make their 50th appearances for the Bulls.
Round 24: Brett Kearney scored his 50th try and reached 200 points for the Bulls.
Round 25: Chev Walker made his 50th appearance for the Bulls.
Round 27: Curtis Naughton and Nathan Conroy made their debuts for the Bulls.
Round 27: Jarrod Sammut scored his 3rd four-try haul and 4th hat-trick for the Bulls.
Round 27: Keith Lulia scored his 1st hat-trick for the Bulls.

Pre Season Friendlies

Bulls score is first.

Player Appearances
Friendly Games Only

 = Injured

 = Suspended

Table

2013 Fixtures and Results

2013 Engage Super League

Player Appearances
Super League Only

 = Injured

 = Suspended

Challenge Cup

Player Appearances
Challenge Cup Games only

2013 Squad Statistics

 Appearances and points include (Super League, Challenge Cup and Play Offs) as of 8 September 2013.

 = Injured
 = Suspended

2013 Transfers In/Out

In

Out

References

External links
Bradford Bulls Website
Bradford Bulls in T&A
Bradford Bulls on Sky Sports
Bradford on Super League Site
Red,Black And Amber
BBC Sport-Rugby League 

Bradford Bulls seasons
Bradford Bulls